Kizugawa may refer to:

 Kizugawa, Kyoto, a city in Japan
 Kizu River in Kyoto and Mie prefectures of Japan
 , a WWII-era Japanese ship scuttled at Guam
 Kizugawa Station in Osaka, Japan
 Battle of Kizugawa in 1614
 Battles of Kizugawaguchi in 1576 and 1578